Frederick Stapleton (11 March 1877 – 9 November 1939) was an English water polo player and swimmer. He won a gold medal in water polo at the 1900 Summer Olympics and finished six and fifth in the 200 m freestyle and 200 m obstacle swimming, respectively representing Great Britain.

See also
 Great Britain men's Olympic water polo team records and statistics
 List of Olympic champions in men's water polo
 List of Olympic medalists in water polo (men)

References

External links
 

1877 births
1939 deaths
Sportspeople from Nottingham
English male freestyle swimmers
English Olympic medallists
English male water polo players
Swimmers at the 1900 Summer Olympics
Water polo players at the 1900 Summer Olympics
Olympic gold medallists for Great Britain
Olympic swimmers of Great Britain
Olympic water polo players of Great Britain
Olympic medalists in water polo
Medalists at the 1900 Summer Olympics